Gameiro is a Portuguese surname. Notable people with the surname include:

Corey Gameiro (born 1993), Australian soccer player
José Gameiro, Portuguese Paralympic athlete
Kevin Gameiro (born 1987), French footballer
Miguel Gameiro (born 1974), Portuguese singer and chef
Raquel Gameiro (1889–1970), Portuguese illustrator and watercolorist

Portuguese-language surnames